Deven Thompkins (born December 23, 1999) is an American football wide receiver for the Tampa Bay Buccaneers of the National Football League (NFL). He played college football at Utah State.

College career
Thompkins was a member of the Utah State Aggies for four seasons. As a sophomore, he caught 40 passes. for 536 yards and four touchdowns. Thompkins played in four games during Utah State's COVID-19-shortened 2020 season and had 20 receptions for 214 yards and one touchdown. Following the end of the season, he entered the NCAA transfer portal. Thompkins ultimately decided to return to Utah State for the 2021 season. As a senior, Thompkins caught 102 passes for 1,704 yards with 10 touchdowns and was named first-team All-Mountain West Conference and a third-team All-American by the Associated Press.

Professional career
Thompkins signed with the Tampa Bay Buccaneers as an undrafted free agent on May 1, 2022. He was waived on August 30, 2022, and signed to the practice squad the next day. He was promoted to the active roster on December 23.  He played in six games during the season, catching 5 passes while also returning 6 punts for 61 yards and 12 kickoffs for 263.  In the Buccaneers Wild Card Round loss to the Dallas Cowboys, he returned 3 kickoffs for 58 yards and 3 punts for 34.

References

External links
Utah State Aggies bio
Tampa Bay Buccaneers bio

Living people
American football wide receivers
Players of American football from Florida
Utah State Aggies football players
Tampa Bay Buccaneers players
1999 births